Robert René Alberts (born 14 November 1954) is a Dutch professional football coach and former player.

Playing career
Alberts played for Ajax's third team and had stints at French outfit Clermont Foot and in the NASL with Vancouver Whitecaps. He finished his career in the Swedish league.

Managerial career
Alberts started his coaching career in Sweden, then moved to Malaysia where he won the league and Malaysia Cup titles with Kedah FA in 1993. He also has coached in Singapore with Tanjong Pagar United and Home United, winning the Singapore Premier League title with Home United in 1999. Later he coached the U-19 teams of South Korea.

He managed the Indonesian champion Arema Indonesia in 2009–10. In doing so, he became the first foreign manager to win the Indonesian top-tier title in his first season.

Alberts took over as manager and head coach of Sarawak FA for the second time in 2011. He had managed the team before in 2008–2009 before going to Indonesia. He held the post until his contract with Sarawak was mutually terminated in 2015, due to poor performances of the team in 2015 Malaysia Super League. During his stay in Sarawak, the team won the Premier League in 2013 and were runners-up in 2011, on both times winning promotion to the Super League. Sarawak also reached the semi-finals of Malaysia Cup in 2013 with Alberts at the helm.

In June 2016, he came back to PSM Makassar after his left on 2011. On 2018 Liga 1, he managed the team to finish on the second place in the final table.

Alberts left PSM due to his health condition, however, he signed contract for Persib Bandung prior to 2019 Liga 1 after Persib sacked Miljan Radović. It made many PSM fans disappointed. He led Persib to reach runner-up on 2021–22 Liga 1. On 10 August 2022, following the pressure by Bobotoh, Persib fans, the club announced his resignation.

Managerial honours

Club
Kedah FA
 Malaysia Premier One League: 1993
 Malaysia Cup: 1993

Home United
 Singapore League: 1999

Arema Indonesia
 Indonesia Super League: 2009–10
 Piala Indonesia: runners-up 2010

Sarawak FA
 Malaysia Premier League: 2013; runners-up: 2011

References

External links
 Biography Robert Alberts

1954 births
Living people
Association football midfielders
Dutch footballers
Dutch expatriate footballers
Dutch football managers
Dutch expatriate football managers
Footballers from Amsterdam
Clermont Foot players
Vancouver Whitecaps (1974–1984) players
North American Soccer League (1968–1984) players
Expatriate soccer players in Canada
Dutch expatriate sportspeople in Canada
Expatriate footballers in France
Dutch expatriate sportspeople in France
Expatriate footballers in Sweden
Dutch expatriate sportspeople in Sweden
Dutch expatriate sportspeople in Indonesia
Singapore Premier League head coaches
Tanjong Pagar United FC head coaches
PSM Makassar managers
Sarawak FA managers
Persib Bandung managers
Arema FC managers
Expatriate football managers in Sweden
Expatriate football managers in Malaysia
Expatriate football managers in Singapore
Expatriate football managers in Indonesia
Expatriate football managers in South Korea